The Pickering Panthers are a Junior "A" ice hockey team from Pickering, Ontario, Canada.  They are a part of North Division of the Ontario Junior Hockey League.

History
In the summer of 2010, the Panthers accepted a merger with the Ajax Attack.

2007 Marathon Game
On February 10, 2007 after 154 minutes and 32 seconds of play, the Toronto Jr. Canadiens defeated the Pickering Panthers in Game 2 of the first round of the playoffs. The game-winning goal was credited to Kyle Wetering at the 4:32 mark of the 6th overtime, after the teams played 60 minutes of regulation, 10 minutes in the first overtime period, and then 20 minute overtime periods thereafter. Toronto outshot Pickering 88–86. On February 12, 2007, TSN show That's Hockey showed highlights of the game and announced that it may be honoured in the Hockey Hall of Fame as the longest junior hockey game in history, far surpassing the last recorded record. A feature column also appeared in the Toronto Sun about the historical game. The game has been officially named the longest game in Ontario Hockey Association history.

Season-by-season results

Playoffs
MetJHL years
1990 - DNQ
1991 - DNQ
1992 - lost quarter-final
Pickering Panthers defeated Wellington Dukes 3 games to none
Thornhill Thunderbirds defeated Pickering Panthers 4 games to none
1993 - DNQ
1994 - DNQ
1995 - DNQ
1996 - DNQ
1997 - lost in round robin quarter-final
Pickering Panthers defeated Oshawa Legionaires 4 games to 2
Sixth in round robin quarter-final (0-5-1)
1998 - lost preliminary
Syracuse Jr. Crunch defeated Pickering Panthers 3 games to 2

OJHL years
2020 Won Division quarterfinal 4 games to 0 against Georgetown Raiders and all the playoff games were cancelled after this round
2022 OJHL CHAMPIONS Pickering Panthers defeated Toronto Jr.Canadiens 4 games to 3

Notable alumni

Andy Andreoff
Glenn Healy
Cameron Palmer
Tanner Shaw
Sean McMorrow
Joe Nieuwendyk
Bernie Saunders, 5th black player in NHL history

References

External links
Panthers webpage

Ontario Provincial Junior A Hockey League teams
Pickering, Ontario
Ice hockey clubs established in 1972
1972 establishments in Ontario